Gallatin First Presbyterian Church is a historic church in Gallatin, Sumner County, Tennessee, affiliated with Presbyterian Church (USA).

It occupies the oldest church building in Gallatin in continuous existence. The congregation was organized on October 25, 1828. Church construction took place during 1836–1837. It is built in the early Greek Revival architectural style.

The sanctuary was used as a hospital for Federal troops during the Civil War. The same room suffered major fire damage, from an unattended candle, in December 2004. As a result, the sanctuary was gutted and rebuilt over the course of the following year.

The building was listed on the National Register of Historic Places in 1982. It is also registered with the Presbyterian Historical Society of Philadelphia, Pennsylvania, and is designated as an American Presbyterian and Reformed Historical Site.

References

External links
First Presbyterian Church of Gallatin

Further reading
Sumner County Fact Book 2007-2008. The News Examiner & The Hendersonville Star News. 2007.

Churches on the National Register of Historic Places in Tennessee
Greek Revival church buildings in Tennessee
Churches completed in 1837
Buildings and structures in Sumner County, Tennessee
Presbyterian churches in Tennessee
National Register of Historic Places in Sumner County, Tennessee